Five Marines (오인의 해병 – Oinui haebyeong) is a 1961 South Korean film. It was popular genre-film director Kim Ki-duk's directorial debut.

Synopsis
During the Korean War, five marines are selected for a mission in enemy territory. They carry out the mission successfully, but four of the five are killed before they can return.

References

Bibliography
 
 
  (dead link 2011-11-07)

1961 films
1960s Korean-language films
Films about the Republic of Korea Marine Corps
Korean War films
South Korean war drama films
1961 directorial debut films